For the 2022 FIFA World Cup qualification, there were two scheduled inter-confederation play-offs to determine the final two qualification spots to the 2022 FIFA World Cup. Matches were played on 13–14 June 2022 in Qatar.

Format
The draw for the inter-confederation play-offs was held on 26 November 2021, 17:00 CET, in Zürich, Switzerland.

Four teams from four confederations (AFC, CONCACAF, CONMEBOL, and OFC) were drawn into two ties.

Originally, the two teams in each tie were to play a two-legged home-and-away series. However, the ties were single-leg knockout matches in Qatar.

These play-offs were the last ties to decide the two remaining World Cup slots for a 32-team tournament. The 2026 FIFA World Cup has been expanded to 48 teams, and included as part of the qualifiers a play-off tournament involving six teams to decide the last two berths.

Qualified teams

Matches
For the first time, FIFA decided to hold single-game matches in the World Cup host country, Qatar. They were scheduled for 13–14 June 2022 at the Ahmad bin Ali Stadium in Al Rayyan. They were originally scheduled for March that year, but were moved due to the changes in the FIFA International Match Calendar caused by the COVID-19 pandemic.

AFC v CONMEBOL

CONCACAF v OFC

Goalscorers

Notes

References

External links

Play-Off

FIFA World Cup qualifcation
FIFA
International association football competitions hosted by Qatar
FIFA World Cup qualifcation
Sport in Al Rayyan